Status quo is a Latin phrase meaning "the existing state of affairs".

Status Quo or Status quo may also refer to:

 Status Quo (band), a British rock band
 Status quo (Israel), a political understanding between secular and religious parties
 Status Quo (Holy Esplanade), the Hashemite custodianship of Jerusalem's holy sites
 Status Quo (Jerusalem and Bethlehem), the 19th-century Ottoman firman that dictates the sharing of major Christian sites between various denominations
 Status Quo? The Unfinished Business of Feminism in Canada, a 2012 documentary film by Karen Cho

See also
 Status quo ante (disambiguation)
 Status Quo Ante Synagogue (disambiguation)
 
 Stat Quo, American rapper